Tina Magdalena Konyot (born September 12, 1961, in Hollywood, Florida) is an American dressage rider.

She competed at the 2012 Summer Olympics where she finished 25th in the individual dressage and 6th in the team dressage competition. She has qualified for the 2014 Dressage World Cup Final in Lyon after finishing 3rd overall in the 2013/14 North American League rankings.

References

Living people
1961 births
American female equestrians
Olympic equestrians of the United States
Equestrians at the 2012 Summer Olympics
Sportspeople from Hollywood, Florida
21st-century American women